Russell Allen (born May 5, 1986) is a former American football linebacker. He played college football for San Diego State University. He was signed as an undrafted free agent by the Jacksonville Jaguars on April 26, 2009. On September 5, 2009, he became one of two undrafted rookies, the other being Julius Williams, to make the Jaguars opening day roster. Allen suffered a stroke on December 15, 2013 during a game against the Buffalo Bills. Doctors subsequently advised him to avoid playing again.

Professional career

Jacksonville Jaguars
Allen was named starting weakside linebacker on October 11, 2009 against the Seattle Seahawks. During the 2009 season, Allen played in all 16 games, starting five.

Allen was placed on injured reserve on December 19, 2013, ending his season.

Allen was released by the Jaguars on April 17, 2014 after suffering a stroke on the field.

Retirement
On April 22, 2014, he announced his retirement from the National Football League at the age of 27.

References

External links
 Jacksonville Jaguars Bio

1986 births
Living people
Sportspeople from Oceanside, California
American football linebackers
Jacksonville Jaguars players
San Diego State Aztecs football players
Players of American football from California